"Don't Make Me Over" is a song written by Burt Bacharach and Hal David, originally recorded by Dionne Warwick in August 1962 and released in October 1962 as her lead solo single from her debut album Presenting Dionne Warwick issued under Sceptor Records. The song reached number 21 on the US Billboard Hot 100 and number five on the Billboard Hot R&B Singles chart.

Dionne Warwick original
Warwick recorded "Don't Make Me Over" in August 1962 a song later chosen as the lead single for her debut album Presenting Dionne Warwick. In October 1962, Scepter Records released the track as her first solo single.  Initially, Warwick had found out that "Make It Easy on Yourself" — a song on which she had recorded the original demo and had wanted to be her first single release — had been given to another artist, Jerry Butler. 

From the catchy contemporary phrase "don't make me over",  Bacharach and David wrote and produced their first US top 40 pop hit (No. 21) and US R&B hit (No. 5). It was also a top-forty hit at number 38, in Canada. The background vocals in the song were from the Gospelaires, which featured sister Dee Dee, Sylvia Shemwell and aunt Cissy Houston.

Track listing
UK, 7-inch single
A1: "Don't Make Me Over" – 2:46
A2: "Shall I Tell Her" – 2:33
B1: "Make The Music Play" – 2:25
B2: "Any Old Time Of Day" – 2:25

 France, 7-inch single
A1: "Don't Make Me Over" – 2:46
A2: "Shall I Tell Her" – 3:20
B1: "I Smiled Yesterday" – 2:44
B2: "Wishin' And Hopin'" – 2:25

Charts

Weekly charts

Jennifer Warnes version

Sybil version

In July 1989, American singer Sybil released a dance cover of the song as the second single from her second album, Sybil (1989). Her version became a number-one hit in New Zealand for four weeks, reached number 20 on the US Billboard Hot 100, and peaked at number two on the Billboard Hot Black Singles chart, eventually receiving a gold certification from the Recording Industry Association of America (RIAA). This version also became a UK hit, peaking at number 19 on the UK Singles Chart.

Critical reception
Bill Coleman from Billboard described Sybil's cover as a "spirited Soul II Soul-ish rendition of the Dionne Warwick classic [that] has smash written all over it". In an retrospective review, Pop Rescue stated that it has a beat that musically reminds of "a hybrid" of Soul II Soul's "Keep On Movin'" and Take That's "Pray", calling it "mellow and soulful". Miranda Sawyer from Smash Hits noted "the swoony dance wisples" of the song. David Keeps from Spin felt Sybil "seems to be emerging as the Dionne Warwick of the Soul II Soul generation", remarking her "achingly sexy conga-strings-and-coos" version of "Don't Make Me Over".

Track listing

Charts

Weekly charts

Year-end charts

Certifications

Other cover versions
Various covers of the song have been made:
 In January 1966, Liverpudlian band The Swinging Blue Jeans released a cover version which peaked at 31 in the United Kingdom.
 February 1969 Shirley and Johnny British Duo had minor success with the song. Mercury MF1074
 Brenda & The Tabulations hit number 15 on the US R&B charts with their cover in 1970. 
 Jennifer Warnes released version reached number 67 on the US Hot 100 in 1979.

References

1962 songs
1962 debut singles
1989 singles
Grammy Hall of Fame Award recipients
Songs with lyrics by Hal David
Songs with music by Burt Bacharach
Dionne Warwick songs
Jennifer Warnes songs
Number-one singles in New Zealand
Scepter Records singles
Sybil (singer) songs